Mir Shams ol Din (also Romanized as Mīr Shams ol Dīn and Mīr Shams od Dīn) is a village in Mir Shams ol Din Rural District, in the Central District of Tonekabon County, Mazandaran Province, Iran. At the 2006 census, its population was 1,386, in 400 families.

References 

Populated places in Tonekabon County